The 61st Academy Awards ceremony, organized by the Academy of Motion Picture Arts and Sciences (AMPAS), honored the best films of 1988, and took place on Wednesday, March 29, 1989, at the Shrine Auditorium in Los Angeles, beginning at 6:00 p.m. PST / 9:00 p.m. EST. During the ceremony, AMPAS presented Academy Awards (commonly referred to as Oscars) in 23 categories. The ceremony, televised in the United States by ABC, was produced by Allan Carr and directed by Jeff Margolis. Ten days earlier, in a ceremony held at the Beverly Hills Hotel in Beverly Hills, California, the Academy Awards for Technical Achievement were presented by host Angie Dickinson.

Rain Man won four awards, including the Best Picture. Other winners included Who Framed Roger Rabbit with four awards, Dangerous Liaisons with three, and The Accused, The Accidental Tourist, A Fish Called Wanda, The Appointments of Dennis Jennings, Beetlejuice, Bird, Hôtel Terminus: The Life and Times of Klaus Barbie, The Milagro Beanfield War, Mississippi Burning, Pelle the Conqueror, Tin Toy, Working Girl, and You Don't Have to Die with one. The telecast garnered over 42 million viewers in the United States, making the most viewed ceremony up to that point until it was surpassed by the 70th Academy Awards in 1998, which garnered a viewership of over 57 million.

Winners and nominees 
The nominees for the 61st Academy Awards were announced on February 15, 1989, at the Samuel Goldwyn Theater in Beverly Hills, California, by Richard Kahn, president of the Academy, and actress Anne Archer. Rain Man led all nominees, with eight nominations; Dangerous Liaisons and Mississippi Burning tied for second with seven each.

The winners were announced at the award ceremony on March 29, 1989. Best Actress winner Jodie Foster became the eighth person in history to win the aforementioned category for a film with a single nomination. The last person to achieve this feat was Sophia Loren when she won for Two Women in 1961. Best Actor winner Dustin Hoffman was the fifth person to win the aforementioned category twice. Sigourney Weaver became the fifth performer to receive two acting nominations in the same year but did not win in either category. John Lasseter and  William Reeves won Best Animated Short Film for Tin Toy, which was Pixar's first Oscar ever and was the first CGI film to win an Oscar.

Awards 

Winners are listed first, highlighted in boldface and indicated with double dagger.

Academy Honorary Awards
National Film Board of Canada
Eastman Kodak Company

Special Achievement Award 
 Richard Williams "for the animation direction of Who Framed Roger Rabbit.

Films with multiple nominations and wins

The following 17 films received multiple nominations:

The following three films received multiple awards:

Note: Who Framed Roger Rabbit received 3 competitive Academy Awards of Merit. In addition, the film received a Special Achievement Award.

Presenters and performers
The following individuals, listed in order of appearance, presented awards or performed musical numbers:

Presenters

Performers

The ceremony

 
In an attempt to attract viewers to the telecast and increase interest in the festivities, the Academy hired film producer and veteran Oscar ceremony executive talent coordinator Allan Carr to produce the 1989 ceremony. In interviews with various media outlets, he expressed that it was a dream come true to produce the Oscars.

Notable changes were introduced in the production of the telecast. For the first time, presenters announced each winner with the phrase "And the Oscar goes to..." rather than "And the winner is...". The green room where Oscar presenters, performers, and winners gathered backstage was transformed into a luxurious suite complete with furniture, pictures, refreshments, and other amenities called "Club Oscar". Instead of hiring a host for the proceedings, Carr heavily relied on presenters often grouped in pairs that had some connection, either through family or the film industry (a theme he billed as "couples, companions, costars, and compadres"); not until 2019 would another ceremony lack a host.

Several other people were involved in the production of the ceremony. Jeff Margolis served as director of the telecast. Lyricist and composer Marvin Hamlisch was hired as musical supervisor of the festivities. Comedian and writer Bruce Vilanch was hired as a writer for the broadcast, a role he filled until 2014. Carr had also rounded up eighteen young stars, including Patrick Dempsey, Corey Feldman, Ricki Lake, and Blair Underwood, to perform in a musical number entitled "I Wanna Be an Oscar Winner". Unlike in most Oscar ceremonies, however, Carr announced that none of the three songs nominated for Best Original Song would be performed live.

The telecast was also remembered for being the final public appearance of actress and comedian Lucille Ball, where she and co-presenter Bob Hope were given a standing ovation. On April 26, almost a month after the ceremony, she died from a dissecting aortic aneurysm at age 77.

Opening number
In an effort to showcase more glamour and showmanship in the ceremony, producer Carr hired playwright Steve Silver to co-produce an opening number inspired by Silver's long-running musical revue Beach Blanket Babylon. The segment consisted of an elaborate stage show centered on actress Eileen Bowman dressed as Snow White from Disney's Snow White and the Seven Dwarfs, who comes to Hollywood and is entranced by its glamour. Like Beach Blanket Babylon, the opening act also featured dancers wearing giant, elaborate hats. In a setting designed to resemble the Cocoanut Grove nightclub, Hollywood dignitaries such as actresses Alice Faye, Dorothy Lamour, Cyd Charisse, her husband Tony Martin, as well as Buddy Rogers and Vincent Price were prominently featured, while singer and television producer Merv Griffin sang a rendition of the song "I've Got a Lovely Bunch of Coconuts" (of which he had had a hit recording in 1949). Bowman and actor Rob Lowe then sang a reworked version of Creedence Clearwater Revival's "Proud Mary", with lyrics rewritten to refer to the film industry; it is this song for which the act is infamously remembered.

Critical reviews and public reaction
The show was panned by most of the media publications. Los Angeles Times television critic Howard Rosenberg lamented, "the Academy Awards telecast on ABC was surprisingly devoid of magic. It was on the musty side, and compared with last month's Grammycast, absolutely moribund." Film critic Janet Maslin chastised the opening number, saying it "deserves a permanent place in the annals of Oscar embarrassments". She also bemoaned that the "I Wanna Be an Oscar Winner" number "was confusingly shot and inspired no confidence in Hollywood's future". Television editor Tony Scott of Variety complained, "The 61st Annual Academy Awards extravaganza—seen in 91 different countries including, for the first time, the Soviet Union—turned out to be a TV nyet" He also observed that the "Break-Out Superstars number" looked like they were "cavorting around a giant Oscar as if it were the golden calf".

The telecast also received a mixed reception from professionals within the show business industry. Talent agent Michael Ovitz praised Carr saying that he had "brought show business back to the movie business". Actress Jennifer Jones thanked Carr in a written letter to the producer, which read "You delivered." On the other hand, seventeen people, including actors Paul Newman, Gregory Peck, and Julie Andrews, and directors Billy Wilder and Joseph L. Mankiewicz, signed an open letter deriding the telecast as "an embarrassment to both the Academy and the entire motion picture industry".

There has been speculation that some of the blowback against the ceremony, which was the first produced by an openly gay person and which prominently featured a musical number based on a gay nightclub show, was homophobic in nature, although others, such as Bruce Vilanch and David Geffen, have challenged that assessment.

In addition, The Walt Disney Company filed suit against AMPAS for use of the likeness of Snow White. The lawsuit demanded unspecified damages for "copyright infringement, unfair competition, and dilution of business reputation". Academy President Richard Kahn immediately issued an apology to the studio, and the lawsuit was subsequently dropped.

Bowman has claimed that she was made to sign a gag order the next day prohibiting her from speaking to the press about her performance for the next 13 years. She finally spoke about it publicly in a 2013 interview, in which she described the performance as looking "like a gay bar mitzvah".

Ratings and aftermath
Despite the criticism regarding the production of the ceremony, the American telecast on ABC drew in an average of 42.68 million people over its length, which was a 1% increase from the previous year's ceremony. The show also drew higher Nielsen ratings compared to the previous ceremony, with 29.81% of households watching over a 50.41 share. It was the highest-rated Oscar broadcast since the 56th ceremony, held in 1984.

Nevertheless, AMPAS created an Awards Presentation Review Committee to evaluate and determine why the telecast earned such a negative reaction from the media and the entertainment industry. The committee later determined that Carr's biggest mistake was allowing the questionable opening number to run for 12 minutes. Producer and former Directors Guild of America president Gilbert Cates, who headed the committee, said that Carr would have not received such harsh criticism if the number had been much shorter. Cates was subsequently hired as producer of the succeeding year's telecast.

According to various showbiz insiders and reporters, the criticism and backlash from the ceremony resulted in Carr never again producing a film or theatrical show. He died from complications resulting from liver cancer on June 29, 1999, at the age of 62.

Box office performance of nominees
At the time of the nominations announcement on February 15, the combined gross of the five Best Picture nominees at the US box office was $188 million, with an average of $37.7 million per film. Rain Man was the highest earner among the Best Picture nominees, with $97 million in domestic box office receipts. The film was followed by Working Girl ($42.1 million), The Accidental Tourist ($24.2 million), Mississippi Burning ($18.6 million), and finally Dangerous Liaisons ($6.69 million).

Of the top 50 grossing movies of the year, 52 nominations went to 13 films. Only Big (3rd), Rain Man (5th), Working Girl (21st), The Accused (32nd), The Accidental Tourist (38th), Gorillas in the Mist (40th), Mississippi Burning (45th), and Tucker: The Man and His Dream (50th) were nominated for Best Picture, directing, acting, or screenwriting. The other top 50 box office hits that earned nominations were Who Framed Roger Rabbit (1st), Coming to America (2nd), Die Hard (7th), Beetlejuice (9th), and Willow (12th).

See also

 9th Golden Raspberry Awards
 31st Grammy Awards
 41st Primetime Emmy Awards
 42nd British Academy Film Awards
 43rd Tony Awards
 46th Golden Globe Awards
 List of submissions to the 61st Academy Awards for Best Foreign Language Film

References

Bibliography

External links

Official websites
 Academy Awards Official website
 The Academy of Motion Picture Arts and Sciences Official website
 Oscar's Channel at YouTube (run by the Academy of Motion Picture Arts and Sciences)

Analysis
 1988 Academy Awards Winners and History Filmsite.org
 Academy Awards, USA: 1989 Internet Movie Database

Other resources
 

1988 film awards
1989 in Los Angeles
1989 in American cinema
Academy Awards ceremonies
March 1989 events in the United States
Academy
Television shows directed by Jeff Margolis